The Evansville Blackbirds were a minor league baseball team from Evansville, Indiana, that played in the Class B Southern League in 1895. The team finished the season in third place with a 66–38 (.635) record.

References 

Southern League (1885–1899) teams
Baseball teams established in 1895
Sports clubs disestablished in 1895
Sports in Evansville, Indiana
Defunct baseball teams in Indiana
1895 establishments in Indiana
1895 disestablishments in Indiana
Baseball teams disestablished in 1895